The World of Robert Burns is educational software which teaches about the life and times of Robert Burns. It was launched to coincide with the 200th anniversary of Burns's death. The software was awarded Gold by Acorn User magazine.

It was developed by Cambridge Software House in associate with Galloway Education Authority, and featured poems, letters, music, photographs and videos.

References 

Cultural depictions of Robert Burns
Educational software